= Killer Kites =

- Directed by: Paul Dale; Austin Frosch
- Written by: Austin Frosch
- Produced by: Zach Lee
- Starring: Manon Pages; Carter Simoneaux; Austin Naulty; Zach Lee
- Release date: May 26, 2023
- Running time: 72 minutes
- Country: United States
- Language: English

Killer Kites is a 2023 American comedy horror film directed by Paul Dale and Austin Frosch, written by Frosch and starring Manon Pages, Carter Simoneaux, Austin Naulty and Zach Lee

== Cast ==
- Manon Pages as Abby
- Carter Simoneaux as Daniel
- Austin Naulty as Rick
- Zach Lee as The Oracle
- Austin Frosch as Rachel
- Paul Dale as Brock Peterson

== Release ==
The film was released on May 26, 2023.

== Reception ==
Tyler Doupe' of Dread Central rated the film 3/5 stars, calling it a "perfect snack-sized horror picture to put on when you need a good laugh but don’t feel like making a sizable time commitment." He praised the kites as "consistently funny", opining that the kite attack scenes are "an absolute delight". Jason Delgado of Film Threat gave the film a score of 5/10, writing that it "tries hard to be a B-movie" and is thus "not as fun as it could be".

John Black of Gruesome Magazine rated the film 0.5/5 stars and stated: "It's not going to gross you out or give you nightmares. For 67 minutes, though, it can make you laugh at how goofy a movie can get." Scott Marks of Media Play News wrote: "If the goal was to show the lack of artistic interest that went into producing an amateurishly awful film, for all the legitimate laughs this turkey yields, they might just as well have left the lens cap on."
